Madhumalla-3, Toribari is a village located in madhumalla morang of Koshi Zone. It is located 10 km north of Urlabari with hills and rivers. The estimated elevation above sea level is 205 meters.

Education
There is one government and three private schools. Among them three are secondary and one is a primary school.

Economy
Almost all the people are engaged in agriculture. The people earn by selling vegetables and fruits.

References

Populated places in Morang District